Trad. is often an abbreviation of the word "traditional". It may also refer to:

Music
Trad jazz, a style of jazz music in the 1950s and 1960s
Néo-trad, a musical style that arose in Quebec around the turn of the 21st century
Irish traditional music, a genre of folk music that developed in Ireland

Places
Trat Province, Thailand, also spelt Trad
Trat, a town in Thailand

Other uses
Ivy League clothes, a style of men's dress, popular during the late 1950s
Traditional climbing
Trojan skinhead, subculture also known as traditional or trad skinheads

See also
Tradescantia or Spiderwort, a genus of plant species in the family Commelinaceae